Green Valley is a Spanish reggae-dancehall group formed by five musicians, native to Alava and Catalonia. Their songs address social injustice.

History 
In 2001, Ander Valverde, founder of Green Valley, (whose surname translated in English gives name to the band), began performing in Sound System format in Vitoria. One Year later he recorded his first demo solo El sueño perdido and, soon after, in September 2004, the idea of forming a band emerged. Seeing it was accepted by the public they decided to move to Barcelona in 2006.

In 2007, their second demo called Inmigrantes was recorded and they began playing concerts around Spain. In 2010, the band launched their first album “En tus manos”, an album full of reggae, roots and dancehall. The title refers to the call to transform the world in which we live through social awareness with witty lyrics, catchy phrases and an unmistakable voice.

In 2012, they released their second album called La Voz del Pueblo, an album with a critique of the society in which we live. In 2013, the band released their album Mírame a Los Ojos, consisting of acoustic songs. That year was special for Green Valley who made their début in festivals like Reggaeboa Balboa, Lagata or Rotottom Sunsplash 20th. 2014 was their 10th anniversary as a band and they marked the achievement with a special album called Hijos de la Tierra, their fourth album and one which confirmed their notable evolution as a referential group in the national scene. The album was presented for the first time in the Festimad which was celebrated in February 2015.

Members 
 Ander Valverde – vocals and songwriter
 Egoitz Uriarte – drums
 Ander Larrea – guitars
 Juantxi Fernández – bass guitar
 Jonathan Sánchez – keyboards

Discography

Albums 
 2010: En tus manos
 2012: La voz del pueblo
 2013: Mirame a los ojos
 2014: Hijos de la tierra
 2019: Bajo la piel

Demos 
 2002: El sueño perdido (Ander Valverde in solitary)
 2007: Inmigrantes

Samples 
 2013: "Gente real" featuring Tosko
 2013: "Friend" featuring Shinjiman
 2013: "Lo mio lo comparto" featuring Kinki Bwoy

References

External links
 Green Valley's Twitter
 Green Valley's Facebook
 Green Valley's Myspace
 Green Valley's channel in YouTube
 Green Valley's biography

Spanish reggae musical groups